Cthulhu is a fictional cosmic entity created by writer H. P. Lovecraft. It was first introduced in his short story "The Call of Cthulhu", published by the American pulp magazine Weird Tales in 1928. Considered a Great Old One within the pantheon of Lovecraftian cosmic entities, this creature has since been featured in numerous popular culture references. Lovecraft depicts it as a gigantic entity worshipped by cultists, in the shape of a green octopus, dragon, and a caricature of human form. The Lovecraft-inspired universe, the Cthulhu Mythos, where it exists with its fellow entities, is named after it.

Etymology, spelling, and pronunciation
Invented by Lovecraft in 1928, the name Cthulhu was probably chosen to echo the word chthonic (Ancient Greek "of the earth"), as apparently suggested by Lovecraft himself at the end of his 1923 tale "The Rats in the Walls". The chthonic, or earth-dwelling, spirit has precedents in numerous ancient and medieval mythologies, often guarding mines and precious underground treasures, notably in the Germanic dwarfs and the Greek Chalybes, Telchines, or Dactyls.

Lovecraft transcribed the pronunciation of Cthulhu as Khlûl′-hloo, and said, "the first syllable pronounced gutturally and very thickly. S. T. Joshi points out, however, that Lovecraft gave different pronunciations on different occasions. According to Lovecraft, this is merely the closest that the human vocal apparatus can come to reproducing the syllables of an alien language. Cthulhu has also been spelled in many other ways, including Tulu, Katulu, and Kutulu. The name is often preceded by the epithet Great, Dead, or Dread.

Long after Lovecraft's death, Chaosium stated in the Call of Cthulhu role-playing game: "we say it kuh-THOOL-hu", even while noting that Lovecraft said it differently.

Description
In "The Call of Cthulhu", H. P. Lovecraft describes a statue of Cthulhu as: "A monster of vaguely anthropoid outline, but with an octopus-like head whose face was a mass of feelers, a scaly, rubbery-looking body, prodigious claws on hind and fore feet, and long, narrow wings behind." 

Cthulhu is said to resemble a green octopus, dragon, and a human caricature, hundreds of meters tall, with webbed, human-looking arms and legs and a pair of rudimentary wings on its back. Its head is depicted as similar to the entirety of a gigantic octopus, with an unknown number of tentacles surrounding its supposed mouth.

Publication history
The short story that first mentions Cthulhu, "The Call of Cthulhu", was published in Weird Tales in 1928, and established the character as a malevolent entity, hibernating within R'lyeh, an underwater city in the South Pacific. The imprisoned Cthulhu is apparently the source of constant subconscious anxiety for all mankind, and is also the object of worship, both by many human cults (including some within New Zealand, Greenland, Louisiana, and the Chinese mountains) and by other Lovecraftian monsters (called Deep Ones and Mi-Go). The short story asserts the premise that, while currently trapped, Cthulhu will eventually return. His worshippers chant "Ph'nglui mglw'nafh Cthulhu R'lyeh wgah'nagl fhtagn ("In his house at R'lyeh, dead Cthulhu waits dreaming.")

Lovecraft conceived a detailed genealogy for Cthulhu (published as "Letter 617" in Selected Letters) and made the character a central reference in his works. The short story "The Dunwich Horror" (1928) refers to Cthulhu, while "The Whisperer in Darkness" (1930) hints that one of his characters knows the creature's origins ("I learned whence Cthulhu first came, and why half the great temporary stars of history had flared forth.") The 1931 novella At the Mountains of Madness refers to the "star-spawn of Cthulhu", who warred with another race called the Elder Things before the dawn of man.

August Derleth, a correspondent of Lovecraft's, used the creature's name to identify the system of lore employed by Lovecraft and his literary successors, the Cthulhu Mythos. In 1937, Derleth wrote the short story "The Return of Hastur", and proposed two groups of opposed cosmic entities:

According to Derleth's scheme, "Great Cthulhu is one of the Water Elementals" and was engaged in an age-old arch-rivalry with a designated air elemental, Hastur the Unspeakable, described as Cthulhu's "half-brother." Based on this framework, Derleth wrote a series of short stories published in Weird Tales (1944–1952) and collected as The Trail of Cthulhu, depicting the struggle of a Dr. Laban Shrewsbury and his associates against Cthulhu and his minions. In addition, Cthulhu is referenced in Derleth's 1945 novel The Lurker at the Threshold published by Arkham House. The novel can also be found in The Watchers Out of Time and Others, a collection of stories from Derleth's interpretations of Lovecraftian Mythos published by Arkham House in 1974.

Derleth's interpretations have been criticized by Lovecraft enthusiast Michel Houellebecq, among others. Houellebecq's H. P. Lovecraft: Against the World, Against Life (2005) decries Derleth for attempting to reshape Lovecraft's strictly amoral continuity into a stereotypical conflict between forces of objective good and evil.

In John Glasby's "A Shadow from the Aeons", Cthulhu is seen by the narrator roaming the riverbank near Dominic Waldron's castle, and roaring.

The character's influence also extended into gaming literature; games company TSR included an entire chapter on the Cthulhu mythos (including character statistics) in the first printing of Dungeons & Dragons sourcebook Deities & Demigods (1980). TSR, however, were unaware that Arkham House, which asserted copyright on almost all Lovecraft literature, had already licensed the Cthulhu property to game company Chaosium. Although Chaosium stipulated that TSR could continue to use the material if each future edition featured a published credit to Chaosium, TSR refused and the material was removed from all subsequent editions.

Influence

Politics

Cthulhu has appeared as a parody candidate in several elections, including the 2010 Polish presidential election and the 2012 and 2016 US presidential elections. The faux campaigns usually satirize voters who claim to vote for the "lesser evil". In 2016, the troll account known as "The Dark Lord Cthulhu" submitted an official application to be on the Massachusetts Presidential Ballot. The account also raised over $4000 from fans to fund the campaign through a gofundme.com page. Gofundme removed the campaign page and refunded contributions. The Cthulhu Party (UK), another pseudo-political organisation, claim to be 'Changing Politics for Evil', parodying the Brexit Party's 'Changing Politics for Good'; a member of The Cthulhu Party holds the position of Mayor of Blists Hill. Another organization, Cthulhu for America, ran during the 2016 American presidential election, drawing comparisons with other satirical presidential candidates such as Vermin Supreme. The organization had a platform that included the legalization of human sacrifice, driving all Americans insane, and an end to peace.

Science
Several organisms have been named after Cthulhu, including the California spider Pimoa cthulhu, the New Guinea moth Speiredonia cthulhui, and Sollasina cthulhu, a fossil echinoderm. Two microorganisms that assist in the digestion of wood by termites have been named after Cthulhu and Cthulhu's "daughter" Cthylla: Cthulhu macrofasciculumque and Cthylla microfasciculumque.

In 2014, science and technology scholar Donna Haraway gave a talk entitled "Anthropocene, Capitalocene, Chthulucene: Staying with the Trouble", in which she proposed the term "Chthulucene" as an alternative for the concept of the Anthropocene era, due to the entangling interconnectedness of all supposedly individual beings. Haraway has denied any indebtedness to Lovecraft's Cthulhu, claiming that her "chthulu" is derived from Greek khthonios, "of the earth". However, the Lovecraft character is much closer to her coined term than the Greek root, and her description of its meaning coincides with Lovecraft's idea of the apocalyptic, multitentacled threat of Cthulhu to collapse civilization into an endless dark horror: "Chthulucene does not close in on itself; it does not round off; its contact zones are ubiquitous and continuously spin out loopy tendrils."

In 2015, an elongated, dark region along the equator of Pluto, initially referred to as "the Whale", was proposed to be named "Cthulhu Regio", by the NASA team responsible for the New Horizons mission. It is now known as "Cthulhu Macula".

References

Further reading

"Idh-yaa", p. 148. Ibid.
"Star-spawn of Cthulhu", pp. 283 – 4. Ibid.

"Other Lovecraftian Products" , The H.P. Lovecraft Archive

External links

Cthulhu Mythos deities
Fictional characters with dream manipulation abilities
Fictional sea monsters
Fictional priests and priestesses
Fictional telepaths
Literary characters introduced in 1928
New religious movement deities